Kusthi is a 2006 Indian Tamil-language comedy film directed by Raj Kapoor, starring Prabhu and Karthik , while Vadivelu, Manya, Flora, Vijayakumar and Radha Ravi play supporting roles. The music is composed by D. Imman. The film released on 23 June 2006 and was an average hit at the box office.

Plot

The movie begins with Jeeva (Prabhu), running away from his village to Chennai fearing a possible marriage with the daughter of a local chieftain (Radha Ravi), arranged by his father. He joins his old-friend Velu (Vadivelu), who runs an eatery in the city. Meanwhile, he saves a youth (Mahanadi Shankar), a henchman of a local goon Singam (Karthik) from some gangsters. Thus he gets the acquaintance of Singam. Meanwhile, Singam come across Abi (Flora), a research scholar and Jeeva meets Divya (Manya). Both fall in love with them. Enters another goon (Raj Kapoor), who leaves his stolen money with Singam. He runs behind Singam to get the money back.

Meanwhile, Radharavi and his men come down to Chennai in search of Jeeva. Following a mishap, Jeeva admits Singam and an old woman Lakshmi (Latha) in a hospital. Mistaking Jeeva to be their missing grandson, father of Latha (Vijayakumar) and his relatives take him to Kodaikanal. Fearing the Nattamai, Jeeva decides to go to Kodaikanal and acts as their grandson.

Comes Singam with a plan to murder Vijayakumar. However he manages to win the heart of the family members and they arrange for Jeeva and Singam's wedding with Vijayakumar's grand daughters Abi and Divya. Raj Kapoor and Radharavi enter the scene and all confusion begins. The rest is all but how both Jeeva and Singam succeed in walking away with Abi and Divya.

Cast

Soundtrack

Critical reception
S. Sudha of Rediff.com opined that "Coming from a director of B grade films and with out-of-work actors, the film is surprisingly refreshing. A bit of trimming would have helped to quicken the pace, though". Sify wrote "The weakest link in Kusthi is its story which has been ripped off a Malayalam film in the first half and a Telugu film in the latter half! It is nothing but a mish-mash of mistaken identities, slapstick comedy, a bit of glamour, a comic villain, loving grandfather, mother sentiments and lots of crass jokes". Indiaglitz wrote ""The movie unfortunately lacks coherence. Almost all the characters speak lengthy dialogues. Imman's music is a big letdown. Had the movie been released almost an year ago, it could have made some difference". Balaji B. wrote "Some directors can effortlessly move from one genre to another and deliver entertaining films in both. Unfortunately, director Rajkapoor does not belong to that list. The director, who usually directs action film, has tried his hand at comedy with Kusthi and not been very successful. The film, which brings together Prabhu and Karthik after a long gap, is weak on logic and weaker on laughs".

References

2006 films
2000s Tamil-language films
Indian comedy films
Films directed by Raj Kapoor (Tamil film director)